Victorian Slum House, or Victorian Slum, is a historical reenactment reality television series made by Wall to Wall Media for the BBC in 2016, narrated by Michael Mosley. First broadcast on BBC in the United Kingdom and on PBS in America in May 2017, the narrative centers on families and individuals trying to survive in a recreated slum of the East End of London from the 1860s to 1900s. It has a similar concept to The 1900 House, as well as the same producer. In Australia, the series aired on SBS in July 2017 as Michael Mosley: Queen Victoria's Slum, to avoid possible confusion with the state of Victoria.

Episodes
 Episode 1: The 1860s (premiered 2 May 2017)
The participants, many of whom are interested in learning how their ancestors lived, move into an 1860s tenement containing sparse rooms, a single outdoor water pump and outhouses. The lower floor contains a simulated dosshouse for those who may find they cannot make their rent. They attempt to earn money by doing piece work, selling foods or flowers, woodturning, running a grocery store, or tailoring.

 Episode 2: The 1870s (premiered 9 May 2017)
Irish immigrants arrive, seeking work and depressing the English economy, which is felt by all. Various participants are more successful than others at earning money, and the less skilled must work harder with long hours to try to settle their debts. 

 Episode 3: The 1880s (premiered 16 May 2017)
The economy is still bad, but desperate conditions in their own countries continue to force immigrants to London. The participants are horrified to be subjected to gawking inside of their homes by "upper class" visitors paying to being taken through as slum tourists.

 Episode 4: The 1890s (premiered 23 May 2017)
Reform programs being initiated for the poor and their children both help and hinder various residents. The introduction of wide-scale manufacturing also offers hope for a change in fortune. A water shortage impacts the business of one of the residents and makes life harder for the rest.

 Episode 5: The 1900s (premiered 30 May 2017)
The slum house is marked for demolition and the residents consider their follow up options as they prepare to move. The residents reflect on their experiences throughout their time at the slum house and have a feast together, courtesy of King Edward VII.

Production
The structure used to house the participants was the Alice Billings House, near Queen Elizabeth Olympic Park. It was built in 1877 as part of the West Ham fire station as a residence for firemen and their families. The building was so run down that it had to have safety improvements added prior to the film crew dressing it for the series. Three tons of mud were brought into the courtyard to help simulate conditions of the era.

Some modern requirements had to remain in place. Flushing toilets were available (although there were outhouses in the courtyard as there would have been in that setting), and a nutritional baseline was adhered to for the children, although the food provided was typical of the time as much as possible. The participants also did not experience the diseases such as cholera that afflicted people in the slums.

The participants were kept "in character" during their entire stay. The crew did not eat in front of them, and knocked before entering their living quarters. When Mandy Holworth, the tailor's wife, found a hole in her shoe, she approached the crew and they asked her "What would a poor Victorian do?" instead of giving her a replacement set. Her family had two buckets of water - one for rinsing dishes and the other for rinsing their faces and armpits. She said that after the production, the dirt was so embedded under her toenails that it took two weeks to come clean.

Cognate series
Victorian Slum House is one in a line of "time capsule" reality television series.  Others in the genre from the same production company include (in order of broadcast):

United Kingdom
The 1900 House – a modern family reenacts life at the start of the 20th century (aired 1999/2000)
The 1940s House – reenacts life during the Second World War in London (aired 2001)
The Edwardian Country House – reenacts life of a wealthy family in a great house, including servants and staff (aired 2002); broadcast in the United States as The Manor House
Regency House Party – ten modern men and women reenact courtship during the British Regency of the 1810s, complete with chaperones and staff (aired 2004)
Coal House – reenacts life in a 1920s Welsh mining community (aired 2007), with the sequel series Coal House at War set in 1944 (aired 2008)
The 1900 Island – reenacts life in a turn-of-the-century fishing village (aired 2019)

Australia
Outback House – a family running a sheep station in 1861 Outback Australia
The Colony – Four families and several individual "convicts" try to live life in New South Wales of 1800.

New Zealand

Pioneer House – essentially a New Zealand production of The 1900 House.
Colonial House – a recreation of the experiences of typical British immigrants to Canterbury, c. 1850; complete with a sea voyage from Auckland to Lyttelton, tramping over the Bridle Path to Christchurch with their children and belongings, setting up house in a canvas tent, and eventually, building their own house.
One Land – Also a recreation of New Zealand in the 1850s. It featured three families, one Pakeha and two Māori, and aimed to replicate the experiences of British migrants and the indigenous Māori of the period. The Māori families were housed in a traditional pa, and one of those families was specifically chosen for their knowledge of Māori language and customs. This family was asked to speak only Māori throughout the series.

Germany

 Schwarzwaldhaus 1902 (Black Forest House 1902) – a family "living" without electricity in a traditional Black Forest house, on rural Kaltwasserhof in Münstertal (August 2001 – January 2002)
 Windstärke 8 – Das Auswandererschiff 1855 – about an emigration ship for the United States
 Die Bräuteschule 1958 – teenage girls attending a domestic science school in the 1950s
 Abenteuer 1900 – Leben im Gutshaus (The 1900 Adventure) – about a noble family and their servants in a manor in Mecklenburg-Vorpommern.
 Abenteuer 1927 – Sommerfrische (The 1927 Adventure) – life in the manor from Abenteuer 1900, this time in the Roaring Twenties
 Steinzeit – Das Experiment (The Stone Age Experiment) – life under conditions of the Stone Age.
 Die harte Schule der 50er Jahre (Difficult 1950s School) – teachers and students experiencing a boarding school under 1950s conditions.
 Abenteuer Mittelalter – Leben im 15. Jahrhundert (The Medieval Adventure) – people living in a 15th-century castle.

United States
Frontier House – three families live as 1883 homesteaders in Montana
Manor House – British family of five and staff of 14 live in a 1900 English manor house (re-presentation of The Edwardian Country House, exactly the same but with bonus footage)
Colonial House  – set in the American frontier of 1628 (shown in the UK as Pioneer House)
Texas Ranch House  – set in the American frontier of 1867

Switzerland

 Leben wie zu Gotthelfs Zeiten (2004 TV series) – about a Swiss family living without modern technology in a traditional Swiss farmhouse as in the era of the Swiss author Jeremias Gotthelf (1797–1854), similar setting as in the German TV series Schwarzwaldhaus 1902, mentioned above

See also
The People of the Abyss, a book by Jack London detailing his personal experiences while living in the London slums
 The Eliza Armstrong case, involving the purchase of a girl from her mother who needed money, and subsequent exposure of the child sex trade in 1855
 Suffragette

References

BBC reality television shows
British reality television series
Historical reality television series
Television series by Warner Bros. Television Studios